Negro Southern League may refer to either or both of two Negro baseball leagues in the US in the first half of the twentieth century:

 Negro Southern League (1920–36)
 Negro Southern League (1945–51)

See also 
 NSL (disambiguation)